Persicula brinkae is a species of sea snail, a marine gastropod mollusk, in the family Cystiscidae.

Distribution
This marine species occurs off Somalia.

References

brinkae
Gastropods described in 1993